Elections in the Free and Hanseatic City of Lübeck (Freien Hansestadt Lübeck) to its state parliament, the Bürgerschaft, during the Weimar Republic were held at irregular intervals between 1919 and 1932. Results with regard to the total vote, the percentage of the vote won and the number of seats allocated to each party are presented in the tables below. On 31 March 1933, the sitting Bürgerschaft was dissolved by the Nazi-controlled central government and reconstituted to reflect the distribution of seats in the national Reichstag. The Bürgerschaft subsequently was formally abolished as a result of the "Law on the Reconstruction of the Reich" of 30 January 1934 which replaced the German federal system with a unitary state.

1919
The 1919 Lübeck state election was held on 9 February 1919 to elect the 80 members of the Bürgerschaft.

1921
The 1921 Lübeck state election was held on 13 November 1921 to elect the 80 members of the Bürgerschaft.

1924
The 1924 Lübeck state election was held on 10 February 1924 to elect the 80 members of the Bürgerschaft.

1926
The 1926 Lübeck state election was held on 14 November 1926 to elect the 80 members of the Bürgerschaft.

1929
The 1929 Lübeck state election was held on 10 November 1929 to elect the 80 members of the Bürgerschaft.

1932
The 1932 Lübeck state election was held on 13 November 1932 to elect the 80 members of the Bürgerschaft.

References

Elections in the Weimar Republic
Elections in Schleswig-Holstein
Lübeck
Lübeck
Lübeck
Lübeck
Lübeck
Lübeck